Aero Flight GmbH & Co. Luftverkehrs-KG was an airline based in Oberursel, Germany. It operated international charter passenger service.

History
The airline was established and started operations on March 26, 2004. Aero Flight started from the charter airline Aero Lloyd, which had ceased operations in October 2003.

Aero Flight ceased operations October 30, 2005. The airline's assets were subsequently bought by the Iceland-based Avion group in a deal that took effect in early 2006.

Destinations
Aero Flight operated services to the following international scheduled destinations as of January 2005: Adana, Alicante, Ankara, Cairo, Catania, Düsseldorf, Frankfurt, Fuerteventura, Hurghada, Istanbul, Luxor, Munich, Pristina, Santa Cruz de la Palma, Sarajevo, Saint Petersburg, Stuttgart, and Tivat.

Fleet

The Aero Flight fleet consisted of the following aircraft before it ceased operations late 2005:

See also
List of defunct airlines of Germany

References

External links

Aero Flight 

Defunct airlines of Germany
Airlines established in 2004
Airlines disestablished in 2005
Oberursel
German companies established in 2004
German companies disestablished in 2005